Love Trilogy: Chained (in Hebrew: טרילוגיה על אהבה: עיניים שלי) is a 2019 Israeli drama film, and the second installation of the Love Trilogy film series, written and directed by Yaron Shani. The film's world premier took place at the Berlin International Film Festival.

Plot summary 
Rafi "Rashi" Malka (Eran Naim) is a respected veteran police officer, who deals with violent situations on the job. He is married to Avigail (Stav Almagor), who is undergoing fertility treatments. Rashi's tough-guy attitude brings him into frequent conflict with his rebellious step-daughter, Yasmine (Stav Patay), and the family's life is unsettled by frequent fighting. The situation deteriorates when two young men suspected of selling drugs claim that Rashi harassed them sexually, and he is suspended from duty while Internal Affairs investigates. The gradual loss of control over his life pushes him over the edge.

Characters 
Yaron Shani works with a cast of non-actors, who work without a script, improvising the scenes on-camera. The film is shot in single takes, without rehearsals. The lead actor, Eran Naim, is a former police officer, and played a main role in the film Ajami as well.

 Eran Naim: Rafi "Rashi" Malka - a police officer, married to Avigail, stepfather of Yasmine.
 Stav Almagor: Avigail Malka - Rashi's wife, trying to have a baby.
 Stav Patay: Yasmine - Avigail's teenage daughter from a previous marriage.

Production 
The film is an Israel-German co-production. Producers were Naomi Levari and Saar Yogev of Black Sheep Productions, in cooperation with Michael Rotter of The Post Republic. The movie was made with the support of the Israeli Film Fund, Arte, and yes satellite television, and is distributed by Alpha Violet, a French-based independent film distribution company.

Reviews 

Israeli newspaper ynet praised both the film and Shani's project, "meant to blend the line between reality and fiction", "intriguing".

Awards 
 Berlin Film Festival

|-
| 2019
| Love Trilogy: Chained
| Panorama Viewers' Choice
| 
|

See also 
 Love Trilogy: Stripped

References

External links 

 
 
 

2010s Hebrew-language films
Israeli drama films
2019 films
2019 drama films